The 2000–01 NBA season was the Lakers' 53rd season in the National Basketball Association, and 41st in the city of Los Angeles. The Lakers entered the season as the defending NBA champions, having defeated the Indiana Pacers in the 2000 NBA Finals in six games, winning their twelfth NBA championship. During the off-season, the Lakers acquired Horace Grant from the Seattle SuperSonics. Grant won three championships with the Chicago Bulls in the early 1990s. The team also signed free agent Isaiah Rider, who was released by the Atlanta Hawks during the previous season due to off the court troubles, and signed Greg Foster, who had two NBA Finals appearances with the Utah Jazz. Derek Fisher only played just 20 games due to a stress fracture in his right foot, which forced him to miss the first 62 games of the regular season. The Lakers held a 31–16 record at the All-Star break, and won their final eight games, finishing the regular season with a 56–26 record, and won the Pacific Division over the rival Sacramento Kings by one game.

Kobe Bryant and Shaquille O'Neal were both selected for the 2001 NBA All-Star Game, but O'Neal did not play due to a foot injury. The Lakers clinched the #2 seed in the playoffs. O’Neal averaged 28.7 points, 12.7 rebounds and 2.7 blocks per game, and was named to the All-NBA First Team, while Bryant averaged 28.5 points, 5.9 rebounds and 5.0 assists per game, and was named to the All-NBA Second Team. In addition, Fisher provided the team with 11.5 points and 4.4 assists per game, while Rick Fox contributed 9.6 points per game, and Grant provided with 8.5 points and 7.1 rebounds per game. Both O'Neal and Bryant were also selected to the NBA All-Defensive Second Team, as O'Neal finished in third place in Most Valuable Player voting with 7 first-place votes.

In the playoffs, the Lakers swept the Portland Trail Blazers in three straight games in the Western Conference First Round, swept the 3rd-seeded Kings in four straight games in the Western Conference Semi-finals, then swept the top–seeded San Antonio Spurs also in four straight games in the Western Conference Finals. They went on to win the NBA Finals 4–1 against regular season MVP Allen Iverson and the Philadelphia 76ers, earning the franchise its 13th NBA championship. O'Neal was named Finals MVP for the second straight year. It was the second of the Lakers' three-peat championships to begin the millennium. The Lakers would finish with the then-best postseason record in NBA history, posting a 15–1 record, suffering their only loss in a Game 1 overtime home loss to the 76ers in the NBA Finals, 107–101. That record would last for 16 years until the Golden State Warriors went 16–1 in the 2017 playoffs.

Following the season, Grant re-signed as a free agent with his former team, the Orlando Magic, while Rider signed with the Denver Nuggets, Tyronn Lue signed with the Washington Wizards, Foster was traded to the Milwaukee Bucks, and Ron Harper, who only played just 47 games due to knee injuries, retired.

Draft picks

Roster

Regular season

Season standings

Record vs. opponents

Game log

Regular season

|- style="background:#cfc;"
| 1
| October 31
| @ Portland
| W 96–86
| Shaquille O'Neal (36)
| Shaquille O'Neal (11)
| Ron Harper (6)
| Rose Garden20,270
| 1–0

|- style="background:#fcc;"
| 2
| November 1
| Utah
| L 92–97
| Shaquille O'Neal (34)
| Shaquille O'Neal (15)
| Isaiah Rider (6)
| Staples Center18,997
| 1–1
|- style="background:#cfc;"
| 3
| November 4
| @ Vancouver
| W 98–89
| Shaquille O'Neal (27)
| Shaquille O'Neal (15)
| 3 players tied (5)
| General Motors Place18,183
| 2–1
|- style="background:#cfc;"
| 4
| November 5
| L.A. Clippers
| W 108–103
| Shaquille O'Neal (39)
| Shaquille O'Neal (14)
| Kobe Bryant (6)
| Staples Center18,997
| 3–1
|- style="background:#fcc;"
| 5
| November 7
| @ Houston
| L 74–84
| Shaquille O'Neal (24)
| Shaquille O'Neal (7)
| Shaquille O'Neal (5)
| Compaq Center14,473
| 3–2
|- style="background:#fcc;"
| 6
| November 8
| @ San Antonio
| L 81–91
| Kobe Bryant (32)
| Shaquille O'Neal (17)
| Kobe Bryant (8)
| Alamodome26,065
| 3–3
|- style="background:#cfc;"
| 7
| November 12
| Houston
| W 105–99
| Kobe Bryant (37)
| Kobe Bryant (10)
| Brian Shaw (4)
| Staples Center18,997
| 4–3
|- style="background:#cfc;"
| 8
| November 14
| Denver
| W 119–103
| Shaquille O'Neal (34)
| Shaquille O'Neal (19)
| Kobe Bryant (9)
| Staples Center18,997
| 5–3
|- style="background:#cfc;"
| 9
| November 16
| @ Sacramento
| W 112–110 (OT)
| Shaquille O'Neal (33)
| Shaquille O'Neal (16)
| Brian Shaw (9)
| ARCO Arena17,317
| 6–3
|- style="background:#fcc;"
| 10
| November 18
| @ Denver
| L 86–87
| Kobe Bryant (32)
| Horace Grant (12)
| 4 players tied (4)
| Pepsi Center19,513
| 6–4
|- style="background:#cfc;"
| 11
| November 19
| Chicago
| W 104–96
| Kobe Bryant (22)
| Kobe Bryant (12)
| Brian Shaw (7)
| Staples Center18,997
| 7–4
|- style="background:#cfc;"
| 12
| November 22
| Golden State
| W 111–91
| Kobe Bryant (31)
| Shaquille O'Neal (14)
| Kobe Bryant (7)
| Staples Center18,208
| 8–4
|- style="background:#cfc;"
| 13
| November 24
| Minnesota
| W 115–108
| Kobe Bryant (29)
| Shaquille O'Neal (16)
| Bryant & O'Neal (5)
| Staples Center18,997
| 9–4
|- style="background:#cfc;"
| 14
| November 27
| @ L.A. Clippers
| W 98–83
| Kobe Bryant (29)
| 3 players tied (7)
| Rick Fox (5)
| Staples Center20,039
| 10–4
|- style="background:#cfc;"
| 15
| November 28
| Indiana Pacers
| W 124–107
| Kobe Bryant (37)
| Shaquille O'Neal (14)
| Fox & O'Neal (6)
| Staples Center18,997
| 11–4
|- style="background:#fcc;"
| 16
| November 30
| @ Seattle
| L 88–121
| Shaquille O'Neal (23)
| Horace Grant (9)
| Rick Fox (5)
| KeyArena17,072
| 11–5

|- style="background:#cfc;"
| 17
| December 1
| San Antonio
| W 109–100
| Kobe Bryant (43)
| Shaquille O'Neal (16)
| Bryant & Shaw (6)
| Staples Center18,997
| 12–5
|- style="background:#cfc;"
| 18
| December 3
| Dallas
| W 99–97
| Kobe Bryant (38)
| Shaquille O'Neal (14)
| Kobe Bryant (6)
| Staples Center18,997
| 13–5
|- style="background:#cfc;"
| 19
| December 5
| Philadelphia
| W 96–85
| Kobe Bryant (36)
| Shaquille O'Neal (20)
| Shaquille O'Neal (6)
| Staples Center18,997
| 14–5
|- style="background:#fcc;"
| 20
| December 6
| @ Golden State
| L 122–125 (OT)
| Kobe Bryant (51)
| Harper & O'Neal (10)
| Ron Harper (10)
| The Arena in Oakland19,273
| 14–6
|- style="background:#fcc;"
| 21
| December 8
| Seattle
| L 95–103
| Shaquille O'Neal (26)
| Shaquille O'Neal (17)
| Grant & O'Neal (5)
| Staples Center18,997
| 14–7
|- style="background:#cfc;"
| 22
| December 10
| Detroit
| W 112–88
| Bryant & O'Neal (26)
| Shaquille O'Neal (12)
| Bryant & Fox (9)
| Staples Center18,997
| 15–7
|- style="background:#fcc;"
| 23
| December 12
| Milwaukee
| L 105–109
| Shaquille O'Neal (26)
| Shaquille O'Neal (17)
| Bryant & O'Neal (6)
| Staples Center18,997
| 15–8
|- style="background:#fcc;"
| 24
| December 13
| @ Portland
| L 86–96
| Kobe Bryant (35)
| Shaquille O'Neal (13)
| Kobe Bryant (6)
| Rose Garden20,491
| 15–9
|- style="background:#cfc;"
| 25
| December 15
| Vancouver
| W 98–76
| Horace Grant (19)
| Horace Grant (13)
| Grant & Harper (5)
| Staples Center18,211
| 16–9
|- style="background:#cfc;"
| 26
| December 17
| @ Toronto
| W 104–101 (OT)
| Kobe Bryant (40)
| Shaquille O'Neal (8)
| Rick Fox (5)
| Air Canada Centre19,800
| 17–9
|- style="background:#cfc;"
| 27
| December 19
| @ Miami
| W 81–79
| Kobe Bryant (23)
| Shaquille O'Neal (14)
| Kobe Bryant (6)
| American Airlines Arena19,600
| 18–9
|- style="background:#cfc;"
| 28
| December 21
| @ Houston
| W 99–94
| Kobe Bryant (45)
| Shaquille O'Neal (12)
| Brian Shaw (7)
| Compaq Center16,285
| 19–9
|- style="background:#cfc;"
| 29
| December 22
| @ Dallas
| W 108–103
| Kobe Bryant (35)
| Rick Fox (12)
| Isaiah Rider (5)
| Reunion Arena18,201
| 20–9
|- style="background:#fcc;"
| 30
| December 25
| Portland
| L 104–109
| Shaquille O'Neal (32)
| Shaquille O'Neal (15)
| Kobe Bryant (6)
| Staples Center18,997
| 20–10
|- style="background:#cfc;"
| 31
| December 28
| @ Phoenix
| W 115–78
| Kobe Bryant (38)
| Shaquille O'Neal (11)
| Shaquille O'Neal (4)
| America West Arena19,023
| 21–10
|- style="background:#cfc;"
| 32
| December 30
| @ L.A. Clippers
| W 116–114 (OT)
| Shaquille O'Neal (29)
| Shaquille O'Neal (15)
| Rick Fox (9)
| Staples Center20,327
| 22–10

|- style="background:#cfc;"
| 33
| January 3
| Utah
| W 82–71
| Kobe Bryant (31)
| Shaquille O'Neal (17)
| Bryant & Fox (4)
| Staples Center18,997
| 23–10
|- style="background:#fcc;"
| 34
| January 7
| L.A. Clippers
| L 95–118
| Shaquille O'Neal (33)
| Horace Grant (10)
| Shaquille O'Neal (5)
| Staples Center18,997
| 23–11
|- style="background:#cfc;"
| 35
| January 12
| Cleveland
| W 101–98
| Shaquille O'Neal (34)
| Shaquille O'Neal (23)
| Bryant & Shaw (5)
| Staples Center18,997
| 24–11
|- style="background:#fcc;"
| 36
| January 13
| @ Utah
| L 103–111
| Shaquille O'Neal (30)
| Shaquille O'Neal (12)
| Harper & O'Neal (5)
| Delta Center19,911
| 24–12
|- style="background:#cfc;"
| 37
| January 15
| Vancouver
| W 113–112 (OT)
| Shaquille O'Neal (31)
| Shaquille O'Neal (15)
| Kobe Bryant (11)
| Staples Center18,318
| 25–12
|- style="background:#cfc;"
| 38
| January 19
| Houston
| W 114–101
| Shaquille O'Neal (41)
| Shaquille O'Neal (11)
| Brian Shaw (5)
| Staples Center18,997
| 26–12
|- style="background:#fcc;"
| 39
| January 21
| Miami
| L 92–103
| Kobe Bryant (34)
| Bryant & O'Neal (8)
| Shaquille O'Neal (3)
| Staples Center18,997
| 26–13
|- style="background:#fcc;"
| 40
| January 23
| @ Seattle
| L 80–91
| Shaquille O'Neal (29)
| Shaquille O'Neal (9)
| Kobe Bryant (5)
| KeyArena17,072
| 26–14
|- style="background:#cfc;"
| 41
| January 26
| New Jersey
| W 113–101
| Bryant & O'Neal (26)
| Bryant & O'Neal (9)
| Shaquille O'Neal (8)
| Staples Center18,997
| 27–14
|- style="background:#fcc;"
| 42
| January 28
| @ New York
| L 81–91
| Kobe Bryant (33)
| Bryant & Horry (11)
| Tyronn Lue (4)
| Madison Square Garden19,763
| 27–15
|- style="background:#cfc;"
| 43
| January 30
| @ Cleveland
| W 102–96
| Kobe Bryant (47)
| Horace Grant (14)
| Bryant & Harper (3)
| Gund Arena20,253
| 28–15
|- style="background:#fcc;"
| 44
| January 31
| @ Minnesota
| L 83–96
| Kobe Bryant (24)
| Kobe Bryant (9)
| Bryant & Horry (5)
| Target Center19,006
| 28–16

|- style="background:#cfc;"
| 45
| February 2
| Charlotte
| W 93–87
| Kobe Bryant (44)
| Kobe Bryant (9)
| Brian Shaw (4)
| Staples Center18,710
| 29–16
|- style="background:#cfc;"
| 46
| February 4
| Sacramento
| W 100–94
| Kobe Bryant (26)
| Kobe Bryant (11)
| Fox & Grant (5)
| Staples Center18,997
| 30–16
|- style="background:#cfc;"
| 47
| February 7
| Phoenix
| W 85–83
| Kobe Bryant (32)
| Kobe Bryant (8)
| Kobe Bryant (9)
| Staples Center18,997
| 31–16
|- align="center"
|colspan="9" bgcolor="#bbcaff"|All-Star Break
|- style="background:#cfc;"
|- bgcolor="#bbffbb"
|- style="background:#cfc;"
| 48
| February 13
| @ New Jersey
| W 113–110 (OT)
| Kobe Bryant (38)
| Shaquille O'Neal (14)
| Fox & O'Neal (6)
| Continental Airlines Arena20,049
| 32–16
|- style="background:#fcc;"
| 49
| February 14
| @ Philadelphia
| L 97–112
| Shaquille O'Neal (29)
| Shaquille O'Neal (11)
| Kobe Bryant (7)
| First Union Center21,005
| 32–17
|- style="background:#cfc;"
| 50
| February 16
| @ Charlotte
| W 99–94
| Shaquille O'Neal (38)
| Shaquille O'Neal (12)
| Kobe Bryant (10)
| Charlotte Coliseum19,925
| 33–17
|- style="background:#fcc;"
| 51
| February 18
| @ Indiana
| L 109–110
| Shaquille O'Neal (35)
| Shaquille O'Neal (15)
| Kobe Bryant (9)
| Conseco Fieldhouse18,345
| 33–18
|- style="background:#cfc;"
| 52
| February 20
| @ Dallas
| W 119–109
| Shaquille O'Neal (29)
| Horace Grant (12)
| Kobe Bryant (7)
| Reunion Arena18,287
| 34–18
|- style="background:#cfc;"
| 53
| February 21
| @ San Antonio
| W 101–99
| Shaquille O'Neal (22)
| Shaquille O'Neal (10)
| Shaquille O'Neal (7)
| Alamodome29,849
| 35–18
|- style="background:#cfc;"
| 54
| February 23
| Atlanta
| W 113–106
| Shaquille O'Neal (30)
| Horry & O'Neal (8)
| Fox & O'Neal (8)
| Staples Center18,997
| 36–18
|- style="background:#cfc;"
| 55
| February 25
| Orlando
| W 106–100
| Shaquille O'Neal (37)
| Shaquille O'Neal (19)
| Shaquille O'Neal (6)
| Staples Center18,997
| 37–18
|- style="background:#fcc;"
| 56
| February 28
| @ Denver
| L 101–107
| Kobe Bryant (38)
| Shaquille O'Neal (11)
| Rick Fox (8)
| Pepsi Center19,566
| 37–19

|- style="background:#cfc;"
| 57
| March 3
| @ Vancouver
| W 98–88
| Shaquille O'Neal (34)
| Horace Grant (15)
| Brian Shaw (9)
| General Motors Place19,193
| 38–19
|- style="background:#cfc;"
| 58
| March 4
| Golden State
| W 110–95
| Shaquille O'Neal (26)
| Shaquille O'Neal (15)
| Kobe Bryant (5)
| Staples Center18,997
| 39–19
|- style="background:#cfc;"
| 59
| March 6
| @ Golden State
| W 97–85
| Kobe Bryant (29)
| Shaquille O'Neal (17)
| Brian Shaw (9)
| The Arena in Oakland20,181
| 40–19
|- style="background:#cfc;"
| 60
| March 7
| Toronto
| W 97–85
| Kobe Bryant (29)
| 3 players tied (10)
| Bryant & Shaw (5)
| Staples Center18,997
| 41–19
|- style="background:#fcc;"
| 61
| March 9
| San Antonio
| L 89–93 (OT)
| Kobe Bryant (38)
| Shaquille O'Neal (16)
| 4 players tied (2)
| Staples Center18,997
| 41–20
|- style="background:#fcc;"
| 62
| March 11
| Seattle
| L 97–109 (OT)
| Shaquille O'Neal (29)
| Brian Shaw (10)
| Brian Shaw (7)
| Staples Center18,997
| 41–21
|- style="background:#cfc;"
| 63
| March 13
| Boston
| W 112–107
| Shaquille O'Neal (28)
| Brian Shaw (12)
| Derek Fisher (8)
| Staples Center18,997
| 42–21
|- style="background:#cfc;"
| 64
| March 15
| @ Detroit
| W 125–119 (OT)
| Kobe Bryant (39)
| Shaquille O'Neal (10)
| Kobe Bryant (7)
| The Palace of Auburn Hills22,076
| 43–21
|- style="background:#cfc;"
| 65
| March 16
| @ Washington
| W 101–89
| Kobe Bryant (26)
| Robert Horry (9)
| Derek Fisher (6)
| MCI Center20,674
| 44–21
|- style="background:#cfc;"
| 66
| March 18
| @ Orlando
| W 95–90
| Shaquille O'Neal (33)
| Shaquille O'Neal (17)
| Kobe Bryant (7)
| TD Waterhouse Centre17,248
| 45–21
|- style="background:#fcc;"
| 67
| March 19
| @ Atlanta
| L 106–108
| Bryant & O'Neal (27)
| Shaquille O'Neal (13)
| Derek Fisher (6)
| Philips Arena17,248
| 45–22
|- style="background:#fcc;"
| 68
| March 21
| @ Milwaukee
| L 100–107
| Shaquille O'Neal (36)
| Shaquille O'Neal (13)
| Kobe Bryant (8)
| Bradley Center18,717
| 45–23
|- style="background:#cfc;"
| 69
| March 23
| Washington
| W 104–91
| Shaquille O'Neal (40)
| Shaquille O'Neal (17)
| Shaquille O'Neal (8)
| Staples Center18,997
| 46–23
|- style="background:#cfc;"
| 70
| March 25
| @ Sacramento
| W 84–72
| Shaquille O'Neal (23)
| Shaquille O'Neal (15)
| Fox & Shaw (4)
| ARCO Arena17,317
| 47–23
|- style="background:#fcc;"
| 71
| March 26
| @ Phoenix
| L 83–104
| Shaquille O'Neal (27)
| Shaquille O'Neal (12)
| O'Neal & Shaw (3)
| America West Arena19,023
| 47–24
|- style="background:#fcc;"
| 72
| March 28
| Sacramento
| L 84–108
| Shaquille O'Neal (33)
| Shaquille O'Neal (11)
| Rick Fox (8)
| Staples Center18,997
| 47–25
|- style="background:#cfc;"
| 73
| March 30
| Dallas
| W 98–89
| Shaquille O'Neal (35)
| Shaquille O'Neal (13)
| Rick Fox (8)
| Staples Center18,997
| 48–25

|- style="background:#fcc;"
| 74
| April 1
| New York
| L 78–79
| Shaquille O'Neal (31)
| Horace Grant (12)
| Rick Fox (4)
| Staples Center18,997
| 48–26
|- style="background:#cfc;"
| 75
| April 3
| @ Utah
| W 96–88
| Shaquille O'Neal (31)
| Shaquille O'Neal (11)
| 3 players tied (5)
| Delta Center19,911
| 49–26
|- style="background:#cfc;"
| 76
| April 5
| @ Chicago
| W 100–88
| Shaquille O'Neal (39)
| Shaquille O'Neal (10)
| Derek Fisher (7)
| United Center23,217
| 50–26
|- style="background:#cfc;"
| 77
| April 6
| @ Boston
| W 100–96
| Shaquille O'Neal (39)
| Shaquille O'Neal (14)
| Brian Shaw (9)
| Fleet Center18,624
| 51–26
|- style="background:#cfc;"
| 78
| April 8
| @ Minnesota
| W 104–99
| Shaquille O'Neal (34)
| Shaquille O'Neal (11)
| Brian Shaw (7)
| Target Center20,099
| 52–26
|- style="background:#cfc;"
| 79
| April 10
| Phoenix
| W 106–80
| Shaquille O'Neal (32)
| Shaquille O'Neal (13)
| Brian Shaw (10)
| Staples Center18,997
| 53–26
|- style="background:#cfc;"
| 80
| April 12
| Minnesota
| W 119–102
| Shaquille O'Neal (31)
| Shaquille O'Neal (12)
| Kobe Bryant (9)
| Staples Center18,997
| 54–26
|- style="background:#cfc;"
| 81
| April 15
| Portland
| W 105–100
| Shaquille O'Neal (33)
| Shaquille O'Neal (18)
| Kobe Bryant (7)
| Staples Center18,997
| 55–26
|- style="background:#cfc;"
| 82
| April 17
| Denver
| W 108–91
| Shaquille O'Neal (33)
| Shaquille O'Neal (13)
| Kobe Bryant (5)
| Staples Center18,997
| 56–26

Playoffs

|- align="center" bgcolor="#ccffcc"
| 1
| April 22
| Portland
| W 106–93
| Kobe Bryant (28)
| Shaquille O'Neal (20)
| Kobe Bryant (7)
| Staples Center18,997
| 1–0
|- align="center" bgcolor="#ccffcc"
| 2
| April 26
| Portland
| W 106–88
| Shaquille O'Neal (32)
| Shaquille O'Neal (12)
| Kobe Bryant (7)
| Staples Center18,997
| 2–0
|- align="center" bgcolor="#ccffcc"
| 3
| April 29
| @ Portland
| W 99–86
| Shaquille O'Neal (25)
| Shaquille O'Neal (15)
| Kobe Bryant (9)
| Rose Garden20,580
| 3–0

|- align="center" bgcolor="#ccffcc"
| 1
| May 6
| Sacramento
| W 108–105
| Shaquille O'Neal (44)
| Shaquille O'Neal (21)
| Kobe Bryant (5)
| Staples Center18,997
| 1–0
|- align="center" bgcolor="#ccffcc"
| 2
| May 8
| Sacramento
| W 96–90
| Shaquille O'Neal (43)
| Shaquille O'Neal (20)
| Rick Fox (7)
| Staples Center18,997
| 2–0
|- align="center" bgcolor="#ccffcc"
| 3
| May 11
| @ Sacramento
| W 103–81
| Kobe Bryant (36)
| Shaquille O'Neal (18)
| Brian Shaw (6)
| ARCO Arena17,317
| 3–0
|- align="center" bgcolor="#ccffcc"
| 4
| May 13
| @ Sacramento
| W 119–113
| Kobe Bryant (48)
| Kobe Bryant (16)
| Brian Shaw (5)
| ARCO Arena17,317
| 4–0

|- align="center" bgcolor="#ccffcc"
| 1
| May 19
| @ San Antonio
| W 104–90
| Kobe Bryant (45)
| Shaquille O'Neal (11)
| Horace Grant (6)
| Alamodome36,068
| 1–0
|- align="center" bgcolor="#ccffcc"
| 2
| May 21
| @ San Antonio
| W 88–81
| Kobe Bryant (28)
| Shaquille O'Neal (14)
| Kobe Bryant (6)
| Alamodome35,574
| 2–0
|- align="center" bgcolor="#ccffcc"
| 3
| May 25
| San Antonio
| W 111–72
| Kobe Bryant (36)
| Shaquille O'Neal (17)
| Kobe Bryant (8)
| Staples Center18,997
| 3–0
|- align="center" bgcolor="#ccffcc"
| 4
| May 27
| San Antonio
| W 111–82
| Derek Fisher (28)
| Shaquille O'Neal (10)
| Kobe Bryant (11)
| Staples Center18,997
| 4–0

|- align="center" bgcolor="#ffcccc"
| 1
| June 6
| Philadelphia
| L 101–107 (OT)
| Shaquille O'Neal (44)
| Shaquille O'Neal (20)
| 3 players tied (5)
| Staples Center18,997
| 0–1
|- align="center" bgcolor="#ccffcc"
| 2
| June 8
| Philadelphia
| W 98–89
| Kobe Bryant (31)
| Shaquille O'Neal (20)
| Shaquille O'Neal (9)
| Staples Center18,997
| 1–1
|- align="center" bgcolor="#ccffcc"
| 3
| June 10
| @ Philadelphia
| W 96–91
| Kobe Bryant (32)
| Shaquille O'Neal (12)
| 4 players tied (3)
| First Union Center20,900
| 2–1
|- align="center" bgcolor="#ccffcc"
| 4
| June 13
| @ Philadelphia
| W 100–86
| Shaquille O'Neal (34)
| Shaquille O'Neal (14)
| Kobe Bryant (9)
| First Union Center20,896
| 3–1
|- align="center" bgcolor="#ccffcc"
| 5
| June 15
| @ Philadelphia
| W 108–96
| Shaquille O'Neal (29)
| Shaquille O'Neal (13)
| Bryant & Fox (6)
| First Union Center20,890
| 4–1

NBA Finals
 By winning the Finals MVP award, Shaquille O'Neal joined the list of Kareem Abdul-Jabbar, Magic Johnson, Larry Bird, Michael Jordan, and Hakeem Olajuwon as the only players to win the award at least twice. Tim Duncan, Kobe Bryant, LeBron James, Kevin Durant, and Kawhi Leonard have since joined the list.  Jordan, Olajuwon, O'Neal, Bryant, James, and Durant are the only six to win the award in back-to-back years.
 The Lakers at the time had achieved the best ever NBA postseason record of 15-1, sweeping the Western Conference and then sweeping the 76ers after their Game 1 loss in the Finals. On June 12, 2017, the Golden State Warriors had surpassed this feat, as they would go 16-1, after beating the Cleveland Cavaliers in the 2017 NBA Finals. The Lakers' postseason record was made before the first round of playoffs was extended to be the best-of-7 format which was implemented in the 2003 NBA Playoffs.

Summary
The following scoring summary is written in a line score format, except that the quarter numbers are replaced by game numbers.

∗ denotes a game that required overtime.

Player statistics

Regular season

Playoffs

Award winners
 Kobe Bryant, All-NBA Second Team
 Kobe Bryant, All-NBA Defensive Second Team
 Shaquille O'Neal, Center, NBA Finals Most Valuable Player
 Shaquille O'Neal, League Leader, FG%, 57.2
 Shaquille O'Neal, All-NBA First Team
 Shaquille O'Neal, All-NBA Defensive Second Team

Transactions

References

 Lakers on Database Basketball
 Lakers on Basketball Reference
 

Los
Los Angeles Lakers seasons
NBA championship seasons
Western Conference (NBA) championship seasons
Los Angeles Lakers
Los Angeles Lakers